Central West or Central Western may refer to;

 Central West (New South Wales), an area of New South Wales, Australia
 Central West, Trenton, New Jersey, a neighborhood in Trenton, New Jersey
 Central West, the western region of ITV Central's broadcasting area in the United Kingdom, covering Birmingham and the wider West Midland region - see ITV Central
 Central-West Region, Brazil
 Central-Western Region, Venezuela
 Central Western Time, a time zone in Australia
 Central Western Daily, an Australian newspaper
 Central and Western District, sometimes called "Central West District" (中西區) in Hong Kong
 West Central District, sometimes called "Central West District" (中西區) in Tainan

See also
 Midwest (disambiguation)